Events in the year 2018 in the Republic of the Congo.

Incumbents
 President: Denis Sassou Nguesso

Events

Sport
27 January – season start of the 2018 Ligue 1 (Congo)

Deaths

 3 June – Pierre-Ernest Abandzounou, academic and politician (b. 1940).

References

 
2010s in the Republic of the Congo 
Years of the 21st century in the Republic of the Congo 
Congo 
Congo